Bradley Thomas Lepper (born November 19, 1955) is an American archaeologist best known for his work on ancient earthworks and ice age peoples in Ohio. Lepper is the Curator of Archaeology and Manager of Archaeology and Natural History at the Ohio History Connection.

Background 

Lepper is a native of Hudson, Ohio and graduated from Hudson High School in 1974. He has continued to live in Ohio apart from his time at the University of New Mexico, where he received his bachelor's degree after transferring from the University of Akron. Lepper earned his M.A. and Ph.D. degrees at Ohio State University.

Career 

Lepper began his career as curator at the Newark Earthworks and Flint Ridge State Memorial after interning with the Ohio Department of Transportation. He is known for the excavation of the Burning Tree mastodon, which took place in December 1989 during expansion of a golf course in Licking County, Ohio and which eventually resulted in rethinking then-current ideas about mastodons' diets. The story made Discover Magazine's top fifty science stories in 1991.

Lepper is also known for his work on the Great Hopewell Road and Serpent Mound.

Awards 

 Society for American Archaeology Book Award (2007, for Ohio Archaeology: An Illustrated Chronicle of Ohio's Ancient American Indian Cultures)
 Ohio Archaeological Council Public Awareness Award (2008)

Publications

References

External links 

 Ancient Ohio Trail

20th-century American archaeologists
21st-century American archaeologists
1955 births
Living people
People from Hudson, Ohio